The 1997 Arizona State Sun Devils football team represented Arizona State University in the 1997 NCAA Division I-A football season. The team's head coach was Bruce Snyder, who was coaching his sixth season with the Sun Devils and 18th season overall. Home games were played at Sun Devil Stadium in Tempe, Arizona. They participated as members of the Pacific-10 Conference.

Schedule

Game summaries

No. 10 Washington State

    
    
    
    
    
    
    
    
    
    
    
    

After the Sun Devils built a 24–0 lead midway through the second quarter, Washington State rallied to take a 25–24 lead early in the fourth quarter. Arizona State answered with a touchdown, and the Cougars were driving again. However, the Sun Devils forced two fumbles by Ryan Leaf late in the game that were both returned for touchdowns.

vs. Iowa (Sun Bowl)

Sources: Box score and Game recap

References

Arizona State
Arizona State Sun Devils football seasons
Sun Bowl champion seasons
Arizona State Sun Devils football